The 2022 Marrakesh ePrix was a Formula E electric car race held at Circuit International Automobile Moulay El Hassan in Marrakesh. The race was held on 2nd July 2022. It was be the 10th round of the 2021-22 Formula E World Championship. The race was a replacement for the previously scheduled Vancouver ePrix and made its first appearance since 2020. Edoardo Mortara won the race to claim the lead of the championship, while pole-sitter António Félix da Costa and Mitch Evans rounded out the podium.

Classification

Qualifying

Qualifying duels

Overall classification 

Notes:
  – Sébastien Buemi received a 3-place grid penalty for speeding under red flag.

Race

Notes:
  – Pole position.
  – Fastest lap.

References 

|- style="text-align:center"
|width="35%"|Previous race:2022 Jakarta ePrix
|width="30%"|FIA Formula E World Championship2021–22 season
|width="35%"|Next race:2022 New York City ePrix
|- style="text-align:center"
|width="35%"|Previous race:2020 Marrakesh ePrix
|width="30%"|Marrakesh ePrix
|width="35%"|Next race:TBD
|- style="text-align:center"

Marrakesh ePrix
Marrakesh ePrix
21st century in Marrakesh
Marrakesh ePrix
Marrakesh ePrix